Subhash Verma is a retired Indian wrestler born on 15 July 1968 at  village Malakpur, Baghpat, UP. Verma was trained at the Hanuman Akhara (wrestling school) of Delhi. He was a very famous pupil of Guru Hanuman. He had won Bharat Kesari (Very Popular Indian Style wrestling Tournament) title 15 times in his career. Now he runs his own Akhara to train young wrestler for India.

References

External links
http://pb.bsf.gov.in/Arjuna_awardies.pdf

Sport wrestlers from Uttar Pradesh
1968 births
Living people
Olympic wrestlers of India
Wrestlers at the 1992 Summer Olympics
Indian male sport wrestlers
Wrestlers at the 1988 Summer Olympics
Asian Games medalists in wrestling
Wrestlers at the 1986 Asian Games
Wrestlers at the 1990 Asian Games
Wrestlers at the 1994 Asian Games
Commonwealth Games bronze medallists for India
Wrestlers at the 1994 Commonwealth Games
Commonwealth Games medallists in wrestling
Asian Games bronze medalists for India
Medalists at the 1990 Asian Games
Sportspeople from Baghpat district
Recipients of the Arjuna Award
Medallists at the 1994 Commonwealth Games